Hugo Steurer (1914–2004) was a German pianist and teacher.

Steurer made his debut in 1934. He was considered one of Germany's leading interpreters of Ludwig van Beethoven's piano music.

In 1953–58 Hugo Steurer taught at the University of Music and Theatre Leipzig. Later, he taught at the University of Music and Performing Arts Munich. Among his pupils were or are Homero Francesch, Gerhard Oppitz, Heinz Rögner, Michael Endres, and Annerose Schmidt.

References

External links 
Copyright-free Hugo Steurer recordings of various Beethoven compositions, from The European Archive

1914 births
2004 deaths
German pianists
20th-century pianists
20th-century German musicians